Brownvale is a hamlet in northern Alberta, Canada within the Municipal District of Peace No. 135.

The community originated in the mid-1920s when the railway was extended from Berwyn to Whitelaw.  The town was named after John Brown who came to the area in 1913.  In 1924 his homestead was chosen for the location of the community.

Demographics 

See also 
List of communities in Alberta
List of designated places in Alberta
List of hamlets in Alberta

References 

Hamlets in Alberta
Designated places in Alberta
Municipal District of Peace No. 135